The 1970 Tulane Green Wave football team was an American football team that represented Tulane University during the 1970 NCAA University Division football season as an independent. In their fifth year under head coach Jim Pittman, the team compiled a 8–4 record and defeated Colorado in the Liberty Bowl.

Schedule

Roster

References

Tulane
Tulane Green Wave football seasons
Liberty Bowl champion seasons
Tulane Green Wave football